Eucorethra is a monotypic genus of phantom midges (flies in the family Chaoboridae).  The sole species is Eucorethra underwoodi Underwood, 1903.

Chaoboridae
Articles created by Qbugbot
Culicoidea genera